Solitary mastocytoma may be present at birth or may develop during the first weeks of life, originating as a brown macule that urticates on stroking.

See also
Mastocytosis
Skin lesion

References

External links 

 
Dermal and subcutaneous growths